Mani Rathnam is a 1994 Tamil-language drama film directed by K. Jayabalan. The film stars Napoleon, Anand Babu, Mohana and newcomer Chandini, with Vadivelu, Babloo Prithiveeraj, Jafar Azad and Vittal Prasad playing supporting roles. It was released on 2 November 1994. The film failed at the box office.

Plot

Rathnam (Napoleon) is a potter in his village and he is a short-tempered person. He has a sister Kavitha (Mohana) studying in the city. Rathnam finally marries his relative Thangamani (Chandini) who has been in love with Rathnam since her childhood.

Sivalingam (Jafar Azad) is a wealthy and wicked man in his village, his son Nadarajan (Babloo Prithiveeraj) is mentally ill. Sivalingam wants absolutely to build a factory in the village. Sivalingam already bought all the lands he needed in his village, he needs only one land : Rathnam's land which is near the temple. Rathnam refuses : he does not want to see the village temple being demolished by Sivalingam. When Sivalingam sends his henchmen to demolish the temple, Rathnam intervenes and beats them all. In the meantime, Kavitha and Mani (Anand Babu) fall in love with each other in the city. Actually, Nadarajan is in love with Kavitha since school days and Sivalingam asks Thangamani to marry his mentally ill son to Kavitha but Thangamani rejects and insults him.

Later, Rathnam picked his sister up at the railway station, at their return to home, they see Thangamani hanged. What transpires later forms the crux of the story.

Cast

Napoleon as Rathnam
Anand Babu as Mani
Mohana as Kavitha
Chandini as Thangamani
Vadivelu as Chappani/Chappani Samiyar
Babloo Prithiveeraj as Nadarajan
Jafar Azad as Sivalingam
Vittal Prasad as Kanakku
Loose Mohan
K. K. Soundar as Thangam's father
Raja as Raja
Thillai Rajan
Idichapuli Selvaraj as wine shop customer
Vellai Subbaiah
Karuppu Subbiah as wine shop customer
Oru Viral Krishna Rao
Kullamani
Vichithra
Anuja
Thayir Vadai Desigan as Armstrong, wine shop customer
Premi as Thangam's mother
Pasi Sathya
Ramya
Kovai Senthil as conductor
Mahendran
Marthandan as Chinna Thambi
Dhamu (uncredited role)
Vaiyapuri (uncredited role)

Soundtrack

The film score and the soundtrack were composed by Sirpy. The soundtrack, released in 1994, features 6 tracks with lyrics written by Vairamuthu, Thamizhmani, Neeraja and Ravi.

Reception
Malini Mannath of The New Indian Express gave the film a positive review and called the film "fairly engaging".

References

1994 films
1990s Tamil-language films
Indian drama films